The 2018 Ukrainian Cup Final was a football match that has been scheduled to be played on May 9, 2018 in Dnipro. This was the second time the cup final has been held in Dnipro. The match was the 27th Ukrainian Cup Final since fall of the Soviet Union.

Road to Dnipro

Note: In all results below, the score of the finalist is given first (H: home; A: away).

Previous encounters 

The game between Shakhtar and Dynamo has become the main fixture of every season and received a nickname of Klasychne which means Classic. Before this game both teams met in a final of Ukrainian Cup nine times, the first being back in 2002. Games between the two clubs are known to be very intense and out of the nine previous meetings in the final, only two in 2003 and 2017 did not have red cards shown to players. There were total of 14 red cards shown with 13 in finals only.

Before this final out of the previous nine Shakhtar won 4 games and Dynamo won 4, one more game Dynamo won on penalty kicks. In total both teams met in this competition 13 times, once in semifinals, once in quarterfinals, once in round of 16 and once in round of 32. The total record is +4=1-8 in favor of Shakhtar. There were only two games when Shakhtar did not score against Dynamo, in 2005 and in 2015.

It is going to be 150th game of Shakhtar in Ukrainian Cup competition. This will be the 18th time and the competition's record for Miners reaching the final stage. This will be the 16th time for Dynamo reaching the final stage. Both teams won the cup trophy an even number of times, 11 a piece. It will be the eighth consecutive final for Miners since 2011.

Aliaksandr Khatskevich as a Dynamo player two times scored against Shakhtar back in 2000 and 2003.

Before the final, in 2017-18 season Shakhtar and Dynamo has met three times within the league competition where Dynamo has won two and one game was tied.

For Yuriy Mozharovskyi this is the third cup final. With him, Dynamo has already beat Shakhtar twice; however considering results of the Ukrainian Super Cup in 2014, total tally between those teams with this referee at such level is 2 to 1 respectfully.

Before the game 
The game was scheduled on the day of the former Soviet holiday Victory Day that is continued to be celebrated in the Russian Federation as a national holiday.

Before the final in interview to the Football Federation of Ukraine (FFU) website Dynamo manager Aliaksandr Khatskevich stated that his team intends to continue to compete for the championship despite trailing five points behind the Miners with just two more rounds before finishline. However with the victory in the Cup, Dynamo also will be happy. Identifying the key players in Shakhtar, the head coach of Dynamo pointed to Pyatov, Rakitskyi, and Taison. Khatskevich stated that he considers them leaders in each of the team's positions. At the end the Dynamo's manager drew attention that today's game will differ from previous ones in which Kievans had not yielded to Miners. In the championship the White-Blues defeated Donchans twice and one time a game ended in draw.

At the same time Shakhtar manager Paulo Fonseca also giving an interview to the FFU website stated that he anticipates a very difficult and emotional match against Dynamo in the final of Ukrainian Cup. According to the Portuguese specialist both teams have changed significantly compared with the past year final, in which Shakhtar beat Kievans (1:0). He also explained why games with Dynamo are for him special and at the end highlighted the principles on which the game of his team is built.

According to the Ukraine international and Shakhtar player Marlos Kievans became stronger in comparison with the past year final. Another Ukraine international and Dynamo player Ruslan Rotan stated that for Dynamo play two ex-Dniprians: Denys Boiko and him. Nonetheless, Dniprian fans will be cheering for Dynamo as there are traditionally more supporters of the Kievan club. Active fans of Dniprian and Kievan clubs befriend with one another therefore the support will be on the Dynamo's side.

Before the game a street brawl occurred between football fans, which led to have some 20 individuals to be detained, according to a representative of local police. One police officer received burn injury due to a pyrotechnic device and a police patrol vehicle has been vandalized.

Some minor technical issue occurred when for about 15 minutes at the stadium disappeared light with only scoreboard and commercial ads boards staying lit.

Match

Statistics

After the game
Right before the end of the game, the Shakhtar right back Bohdan Butko suffered an injury at the 90th minute and was brought out of the field on stretchers. He was substituted by David Khocholava. It was seen as Butko was leaving the pitch that he was applying an ice to his left thigh. During the game Butko assisted on the first goal by Ferreyra.

At the post game press conference Khatskevich stated that no one showed oneself expressively and he won't point to nobody. The team lost all together. He stated that Dynamo was punished for its mistakes, while Shakhtar that also was making mistakes, Dynamo failed to punish. This says about the class of footballers. Khatskevich pointed that Dynamo has good young lads, but yet there is work and work as in terms of mentality so is technique and tactics.

During "Futbol 1" broadcast, Fonseca stated that today there won the team that dominated in the game, and that Shakhtar throughout the game was closer to goals than Dynamo. In defense Shakhtar played totally safe and controlled the game. He noted that to score on Dynamo is not easy as they defend well, but today Shakhtar had ideal strategy. Shakhtar showed patience and was scoring at right moments.

See also
 2017–18 Ukrainian Premier League

References

External links 
 
 Dynamo - Shakhtar 0:2: "Miners" captured the Ukrainian Cup. Video of goals (Динамо – Шахтер – 0-2: "горняки" взяли Кубок Украины. Видео голов). Glavred. 9 May 2018
 Ukrainian Cup final. Dynamo 0-2 Shakhtar. Game review (9 May 2018) (Финал Кубка Украины. Динамо 0-2 Шахтер. Обзор матча (9.05.2018)). Shakhtar Donetsk youtube channel

Cup Final
Ukrainian Cup finals
Ukrainian Cup Final 2018
Ukrainian Cup Final 2018
Ukrainian Cup Final 2018
Ukrainian Cup Final